Denis Biševac (born 22 September 1996) is a Serbian-born Bosnian professional footballer who plays as a right-back.

Club career

Novi Pazar
Biševac joined the first team of FK Novi Pazar during the 2014–15 season, and also stayed with youth team until the end of same season. 

After the end of his youth career, Biševac stayed with the first team under a scholarship contract until the end of 2015. He also spent some period during 2015 with FK Jošanica at dual registration.

Biševac made his senior debut for Novi Pazar in the 30th fixture match of 2015–16 Serbian SuperLiga against FK Radnik Surdulica on 3 May 2016, replacing Irfan Vusljanin in the 86th minute of that match.

He left Novi Pazar in the summer of 2018.

Velež Mostar
On 18 June 2018, Biševac signed with First League of FBiH club FK Velež Mostar. He made his debut for Velež on 25 August 2018, in a 1–3 away win against NK Jedinstvo Bihać.

On 25 May 2019, Biševac won the First League of FBiH with Velež after the club beat NK Bosna Visoko 0–2 away and got promoted to the Premier League of Bosnia and Herzegovina.

Return to Novi Pazar
In July 2019, Biševac left Velež after his contract got expired and decided to return to Novi Pazar.

Career statistics

Club

Honours

Player

Club
Velež Mostar
First League of FBiH: 2018–19

References

External links
 

1996 births
Living people
Sportspeople from Novi Pazar
Association football defenders
Serbian footballers
Serbian expatriate footballers
FK Novi Pazar players
FK Velež Mostar players
Serbian SuperLiga players
Serbian First League players
Serbian expatriate sportspeople in Bosnia and Herzegovina
Expatriate footballers in Bosnia and Herzegovina